Pedro de Alcalá (born circa 1455) was a Hieronymite lexicographer. After the conquest of Granada by Castile, he collaborated with fellow member of the Order of Saint Jerome Fray Hernando de Talavera in the latter's efforts to catechize the moriscos (forced converts to Christianity) from Granada. Some authors suggest the possibility of Pedro de Alcalá being a morisco himself, or descent of mudéjares, while others suspect he may be a Jewish converso. Some scholars note that he had limited knowledge of the Arabic grammatical theory and used the Greco-Latin approach to his transcription system.

References 

Hieronymites
1455 births
16th-century lexicographers
Arabists